Sporting de Gijón is a Spanish professional association football club, based in Gijón, Asturias. The club was formed on 1 July 1905.

Sporting de Gijón started playing the Regional Championship of Asturias until La Liga was created in 1929. The club played its first league season in Segunda División. The club promoted to the top tier for the first time in 1944.

To date Sporting de Gijón has competed 42 seasons in La Liga and 42 in Segunda División, never being relegated to lower divisions.

Key
The records only include the results of all La Liga matches played in the club's history, not including playoffs games.
 All teams are listed under the names against which they originally played Sporting de Gijón in the league, if they have subsequently changed their name then this will be.
  Teams with this background and symbol in the "Club" column are competing in 2017–18 Segunda División alongside Sporting de Gijón.
  Teams with this background and symbol in the "Club" column are now defunct or have had a subsequent change of name since they last played a league match against Sporting de Gijón.
P = matches played; W = matches won; D = matches drawn; L = matches lost; GF = Goals scored; GA = Goals conceded; Win% = percentage of total league matches won

All-time league record
Statistics correct as of matches played on 20 May 2017.

Overall record

Statistics correct as of the end of the 2019–20 season.

References

External links
All matches at Futbolme.com

La Liga Record By Opponent
Association football league records by opponent